The 2009 Oceania Nations Cup doubled as the first round of Oceania's qualifying tournament for the 2011 Rugby World Cup. By winning the Oceania Nations Cup, Papua New Guinea advanced to face Samoa in the Oceania qualification final.

Tahiti and New Caledonia were originally slated to participate, but withdrew.

Play-offs

Semi-finals

Final

References

2009
2009 rugby union tournaments for national teams
2009 in Oceanian rugby union
International rugby union competitions hosted by Papua New Guinea